Karlików (Karlykiv; , Karlykiv) is a village situated in the Subcarpathian Voivodship (province) of south-eastern Poland; previously in Krosno Voivodship (1975-1998) and Sanok district, ( east of Sanok).

Karlików– Karlykow 1483, Karlowa 1488, Karlikow 1557, Karlikow 1589,  Karłykiw 1867, village in eastern Lesser Poland, in the Lesser Beskid mountains, Bukowsko rural commune.

History

Karlików was founded in 1483 by the Bals de Lobetanz family. From 966-1018, 1340-1772 (Ruthenian Voivodeship, Sanoker County) and from 1918-1939 Zboiska was part of Poland. From 1772 to 1918 it belonged to the Austrian empire. This part of Poland was controlled by Austria for almost 120 years. At that time the area (including west and east of Subcarpathian Voivodship) was known as Galicia. In 1785 the village lands comprised 61 łan.

Karlików is still a rural village inhabited mostly by ethnic Poles. It contains a ski slope which attracts seasonal tourism. The cemetery in Karlików still contains headstones of the Lemko families who once lived there.

See also
Komańcza Republic (November 1918 – January 1919)

References and literature

 Prof. Adam Fastnacht.  Slownik Historyczno-Geograficzny Ziemi Sanockiej w Średniowieczu (Historic-Geographic Dictionary of the Sanok District in the Middle Ages), Kraków, 2002, .

External links
 Karlikow Ski-park
 Wola Piotrowa
 Caritas in Zboiska
 Castle in Zboiska

Villages in Sanok County